William James was an early and prolific photographer who chronicled Toronto, Ontario.
His works have been widely collected and republished. James came to Canada, from England, in 1906, when he was forty years old.
He made freelance photography his occupation in 1909, and was the founding President of the Canadian Photographers Association.

Mike Filey, the author of a long-running column in the Toronto Sun, on the history of Toronto, described James as a technical innovator.

The City of Toronto Archives hosts a collection of over 6,000 of James's photographs.

Gallery

References
    

1866 births
1948 deaths
People from Walsall
19th-century Canadian photographers
20th-century Canadian photographers
Photographers from Staffordshire
British emigrants to Canada